Zabuye Lake is a hypersaline, landlocked soda lake located at an elevation of  in the Shigatse Prefecture of Tibet Autonomous Region,  from Lhasa. The lake gives its name to the mineral zabuyelite (lithium carbonate, Li2CO3), which was discovered here in 1987 and has been mined since 2004–2005. In 2008, the salt mine at the lake was regarded as the major source of lithium in China.

Etymology
The name of Zabuye Lake is also spelt as Drangyer, Zabayu, Zhabuye, Chabyêr or Chabyer, Tabie or Tchapia sometimes with an addition of "Tsaka" or "caka", which means "salt lake" in Tibetan.

Geography and geology
The lake is located in the Gangdise Mountains (also known as the Lunggar Mountains) deep in the Tibetan Plateau. It is one of 251 salt lakes in Tibet. It is divided into the northern (98 km²) and the southern (149 km²) sub-basins, which are linked by a narrow channel. The southern part is semi-dry and appears white in satellite images. The northern part is fed from two inlets on east and on the west, by the snow melt of the Rianglinag Mountains. The catchment area is 6,680 km², and the lake is surrounded by mountains with a height of 4,600–5,200 m above sea level. The lake is fed by rain, underground water and melting ice. Paleo-lake shore deposits in the area include sand banks, spits and barriers, and interbarrier lakes and lake shore deltas that form a cliff along the lake, in different tectonogeomorphological positions in the lake basin. This accumulation of sediments illustrates the dynamic nature of the lake system and its paleoclimatic characteristics.

Apart from lithium carbonate, the lake has high content of borax and also contains mirabilite and other alkali metal salts with a total content of 360–410 g/L. The approximate elemental concentrations in the brine in g/L are as follows: Na (160), K (60), Li (1.5), Rb (0.25), Cs (0.1), SO4 (20), CO3 (90), Cl (120), Br (3), I (0.02), B (3). The water density is about 1.4 g/cm3 and pH about 10. The lithium content, 1.53 g/L, nearly corresponds to the solubility limit of lithium carbonate in water and is second highest in the world.

The shrinking is revealed by terrace deposits above the present lake level. Up to 14 layers can be distinguished, but only the bottom seven have been evaluated with radiocarbon dating; their age increases from about 5,000 to 24,000 years from bottom to top. The layers from 10 to 14 rise above 4,600 meters and suggest that long ago, the lake was open and had a much larger area.

Lithium production

The production of zabuyelite from the salt lake water began in 2004–2005, after exploration work for the mineral was initiated in 1982. In 1984, lithium was found in micro-fine sediments of the lake and considered amenable to refining in large quantities. Production started from a brine grading 0.12% Li. The company involved with the extraction, Zabuye (Shenzhen) Lithium Trading Co., Ltd., was established in 1999, employs 11–50 people and has the sales volumes of the order $10 million. It has a plant at the lake which had the total capacity of 5,000 tonnes and produced 1,556.5 tonnes of lithium carbonate in 2008. Its capacity was projected to increase to 20,000 tonnes in the near future. The company claims a reserve of 1.53 million tonnes Li (8.3 million tonnes of carbonate) but this estimate is considered as overly optimistic.

Tibet Autonomous Region is investing CNY 1.084 billion to enhance production of lithium from Lake Zabuye. Under this project, the lake is expected to produce 20,000 tonnes of lithium salt, 5,000 tonnes of lithium chloride, 500 tonnes of lithium metal, 200 tonnes of high-purity lithium, 30 tonnes of lithium products and 490 tonnes of other lithium compounds per year. The anticipated annual revenue from this expansion is estimated to be CNY 639 million.

References

External links

Zabuye
Shigatse